João Domingues was the defending champion but lost in the first round to Jesper de Jong.

Thiago Monteiro won the title after defeating Nikola Milojević 7–5, 7–5 in the final.

Seeds

Draw

Finals

Top half

Bottom half

References

External links
Main draw
Qualifying draw

Braga Open - 1